Vecinos is a Mexican sitcom that premiered on Las Estrellas on July 10, 2005. The series is created by Eugenio Derbez, based on the Spanish series Aquí no hay quien viva. The series stars César Bono, Eduardo España, Macaria, Polo Ortín, Mayrín Villanueva, Ana Bertha Espín, Moisés Suárez, Darío Ripoll, and Pablo Valentín.

 The series has been renewed for a fourteenth and fifteenth season. The fourteenth is scheduled to premiere on March 19, 2023.

Series overview

Episodes

Season 1 (2005–07)

Season 2 (2007)

Season 3 (2008)

Season 4 (2017)

Season 5 (2019)

Season 6 (2019)

Season 7 (2020)

Season 8 (2020)

Season 9 (2020)

Season 10 (2021)

Season 11 (2021)

Season 12 (2022)

Season 13 (2022)

References 

Lists of Mexican television series episodes